The 2009 Atlantic hurricane season was a below-average Atlantic hurricane season that produced eleven tropical cyclones, nine named storms, three hurricanes, and two major hurricanes.  It officially began on June 1 and ended on November 30,  dates that conventionally delimit the period of each year when most tropical cyclones develop in the Atlantic basin. The season's first tropical cyclone, Tropical Depression One, developed on May 28, while the final storm, Hurricane Ida, dissipated on November 10. The most intense hurricane, Bill, was a powerful Cape Verde-type hurricane that affected areas from the Leeward Islands to Newfoundland. The season featured the lowest number of tropical cyclones since the 1997 season, and only one system, Claudette, made landfall in the United States. Forming from the interaction of a tropical wave and an upper-level low, Claudette made landfall on the Florida Panhandle with maximum sustained winds of  before quickly dissipating over Alabama. The storm killed two people and caused $228,000 (2009 USD) in damage.

Pre-season forecasts issued by Colorado State University (CSU) called for fourteen named storms and seven hurricanes, of which three were expected to attain major hurricane status. The National Oceanic and Atmospheric Administration (NOAA) later issued its initial forecast, which predicted nine to fourteen named storms, four to seven hurricanes, and one to three major hurricanes. After several revisions in the projected number of named storms, both agencies lowered their forecasts by the middle of the season.

Several storms made landfall or directly affected land outside of the United States. Tropical Storm Ana brought substantial rainfall totals to many of the Caribbean islands, including Puerto Rico, which led to minor street flooding. Hurricane Bill delivered gusty winds and rain to the island of Newfoundland, while Tropical Storm Danny affected the U.S. state of North Carolina, and Erika affected the Lesser Antilles as a poorly organized tropical system. Hurricane Fred affected the Cape Verde Islands as a developing tropical cyclone and Tropical Storm Grace briefly impacted the Azores, becoming the farthest northeast forming storm on record. The season's final storm, Ida, affected portions of Central America before bringing significant rainfall to the Southeast United States as an extratropical cyclone.

Seasonal forecasts

Forecasts of hurricane activity are issued before each hurricane season by noted hurricane experts Philip J. Klotzbach, William M. Gray, and their associates at Colorado State University; and separately by NOAA forecasters.

Klotzbach's team (formerly led by Gray) defined the average number of storms per season (1950 to 2000) as 9.6 tropical storms, 5.9 hurricanes, 2.3 major hurricanes (storms reaching at least Category 3 strength in the Saffir–Simpson hurricane scale) and an accumulated cyclone energy (ACE) Index of 96.1. ACE is, broadly speaking, a measure of the power of the hurricane multiplied by the length of time it existed, so storms that last a long time, as well as particularly strong hurricanes, have high ACE numbers. ACE is only calculated for full advisories on tropical systems at or exceeding 39 mph (63 km/h), which is the threshold for tropical storm intensity. NOAA defines a season as above-normal, near-normal or below-normal by a combination of the number of named storms, the number reaching hurricane strength, the number reaching major hurricane strength and ACE Index.

Pre-season forecasts
On December 10, 2008, Klotzbach's team issued its first extended-range forecast for the 2009 season, predicting above-average activity (14 named storms, 7 hurricanes, 3 of Category 3 or higher and ACE Index of 125). On April 7, 2009, Klotzbach's team issued an updated forecast for the 2009 season, predicting near-average activity (12 named storms, 6 hurricanes, 2 of Category 3 or higher and ACE Index of 100), citing the possible cause as the high probability of a weak El Niño forming during the season. On May 21, 2009, NOAA issued their forecast for the season, predicting near or slightly above average activity, (9 to 14 named storms, 4 to 7 hurricanes, and 1 to 3 of Category 3 or higher).

Midseason outlooks
On June 2, 2009, Klotzbach's team issued another updated forecast for the 2009 season, predicting slightly below average activity (11 named storms, 5 hurricanes, 2 of Category 3 or higher and ACE Index of 85). Also on June 2, 2009, the Florida State University Center for Ocean-Atmospheric Prediction Studies (FSU COAPS) issued its first ever Atlantic hurricane season forecast. The FSU COAPS forecast predicted 8 named storms, including 4 hurricanes, and an ACE Index of 65. On June 18, 2009, the UK Met Office (UKMO) issued a forecast of 6 tropical storms in the July to November period with a 70% chance that the number would be in the range 3 to 9. They also predicted an ACE Index of 60 with a 70% chance that the index would be in the range 40 to 80. On August 4, 2009, Klotzbach's team updated their forecast for the 2009 season, again predicting slightly below average activity (10 named storms, 4 hurricanes, and 2 major hurricanes). On August 6, 2009, the NOAA also updated their forecast for the 2009 season, predicting below average activity (7–11 named storms, 3–6 hurricanes, and 1–2 major hurricanes).

Seasonal summary

During the 2009 season, nine of the eleven tropical cyclones affected land, of which five actually made landfall.  The United States experienced one of its quietest years, with no hurricanes making landfall in the country. Throughout the basin, six people were killed in tropical cyclone-related incidents and total losses reached roughly $77 million. Most of the damage resulted from Hurricane Bill, which caused severe beach erosion throughout the east coast of the United States. In the United States, tropical cyclones killed six people and caused roughly $46 million in damage. In the Lesser Antilles, Tropical Storms Ana and Erika brought moderate rainfall to several islands but resulted in little damage. Elsewhere in the Atlantic, the Azores Islands, Atlantic Canada, Bermuda, Cape Verde Islands and Wales were affected by tropical cyclones or their remnants. In Canada, Hurricane Bill produced widespread moderate rainfall in Nova Scotia and Newfoundland, leaving roughly $10 million in losses. The hurricane also produced tropical storm-force winds in Bermuda. Hurricane Fred briefly impacted the southern Cape Verde Islands as it bypassed the islands early in its existence. The Azores and Wales were also affected by Tropical Storm Grace; however, both areas recorded only minor effects.

The ACE index for the 2009 Atlantic hurricane season as calculated by Colorado State University using data from the National Hurricane Center was 52.6 units. Due to the low number of storms in the season, many of which were short-lived, the overall ACE value was ranked as below-average. Hurricane Bill was responsible for the ACE value for August being 30% above average.

Systems

Tropical Depression One

During late-May, a frontal boundary stalled near The Bahamas and slowly degenerated. On May 25, 2009, an area of low pressure developed along the tail-end of a decaying cold front near the northern Bahamas. Tracking northward, this low gradually developed as it moved within  of North Carolina's Outer Banks. By May 28, deep convection developed across a small area over the low-pressure system, leading to the National Hurricane Center classifying the system as Tropical Depression One. It was the northernmost forming May tropical cyclone in Atlantic history, though subtropical cyclones formed equally far north in 1972 and 2007. It also marked the third consecutive year with pre-season tropical or subtropical cyclones in the basin. The depression moved over the warm waters of the Gulf Stream for the following 24 hours, allowing it to maintain its convection, before moving into a hostile environment characterized by strong wind shear and cooler waters. Late on May 29, the system degenerated into a remnant low.

As a tropical cyclone, the depression had no impact on land. However, the precursor to the system brought scattered rainfall and increased winds to parts of the North Carolina coastline, but no damage. The lowest sea level pressure recorded in relation to the system was 1009 mbar (hPa). Increased winds along coastal areas of the state was possible in relation to the outer edges of the depression.

Tropical Storm Ana

Ana formed out of an area of low pressure associated with a tropical wave on August 11, Ana briefly attained tropical storm intensity on August 12 before weakening back to a depression. The following day, the system degenerated into a non-convective remnant low as it tracked westward. On August 14, the depression regenerated roughly 1,075 mi (1,735 km) east of the Leeward Islands. Around 06:00UTC on August 15, the storm re-attained tropical storm status, at which time it was named Ana. In post-storm analysis, it was discovered that Ana had degenerated into a tropical wave once more on August 16, before reaching any landmasses.

Numerous tropical storm watches were issued for the Lesser Antilles, Puerto Rico and the Dominican Republic between August 15 and 17. Several islands took minor precautions for the storm, including St. Croix which evacuated 40 residents from flood-prone areas ahead of the storm. In the Dominican Republic, officials took preparations by setting up relief agencies and setting up shelters. Impact from Ana was minimal, mainly consisting of light to moderate rainfall. High winds associated with the storm also downed trees and power lines, leaving roughly 6,000 residents without power.

Hurricane Bill

As Ana regenerated into a tropical depression, a new tropical depression developed early on August 15 southwest of the Cape Verde Islands. Light wind shear and warm waters allowed the depression to steadily intensify, becoming Tropical Storm Bill later that day. By August 17, Bill attained hurricane-status about midway between the Cape Verde Islands and the Lesser Antilles. Further weakening took place as Bill brushed the southern coast of Nova Scotia the following day. Shortly before making landfall in Newfoundland, Bill weakened to a tropical storm and accelerated. The storm eventually transitioned into an extratropical cyclone after moving over the north Atlantic before being absorbed by a larger non-tropical low on August 24.

Two people were killed by the storm's large swells—one in Maine and another in Florida. The hurricane came close enough to warrant tropical cyclone watches and warnings in both the US and Canada. Bill was one of three tropical storms active on August 16. Large, life-threatening swells produced by the storm impacted north-facing coastlines of Puerto Rico and Hispaniola as Hurricane Bill approached Bermuda. Along the coasts of North Carolina, waves averaging  in height impacted beaches. On Long Island, beach damage was severe; in some areas the damage was worse than Hurricane Gloria in 1985. In New York, severe beach erosion caused by the storm resulted in over $35.5 million in losses.

Tropical Storm Claudette

Just one day after the formation of Hurricane Bill, the season's third named storm developed on August 16. Forming out of a tropical wave and an upper-level low-pressure system, Claudette quickly intensified into a tropical storm offshore south of Tallahassee, Florida. Early on August 17, the center of Claudette made landfall on Santa Rosa Island. Several hours after landfall, the storm weakened to a tropical depression and the Hydrometeorological Prediction Center took over primary responsibility of the storm. The system quickly dissipated and was last noted over Alabama on August 18.

The National Hurricane Center issued tropical storm warnings for the Florida coastline and residents in some counties were advised to evacuate storm-surge-prone areas. Tropical Storm Claudette, produced moderate rainfall across portions of Florida, Georgia, and Alabama between August 16 and 18. Two people were killed offshore amidst rough seas from the storm. An EF-0 tornado spawned by the storm in Cape Coral damaged 11 homes, leaving $103,000 in damages. Additional damages to coastal property and beaches amounted to $125,000 as a result of Claudette.

Tropical Storm Danny

Around the same time the remnants of Hurricane Bill dissipated over the northern Atlantic, a new tropical storm developed near the Bahamas on August 26. The system, immediately declared Tropical Storm Danny on its first advisory, erratically moved in a general northwestward direction. Danny attained peak winds of  before succumbing to high wind shear. After turning northward, the storm weakened and was eventually absorbed by another low-pressure system off the east coast of the United States early on August 29. High waves from Danny killed a boy in the Outer Banks.

Tropical Storm Erika

On September 1, the season's fifth named storm, Tropical Storm Erika, formed east of the Lesser Antilles. Persistent wind shear prevented the system from intensifying and resulted in the storm's convection being completely displaced from the center of circulation by the time it passed over Guadeloupe on September 2. After entering the Caribbean Sea, Erika briefly regained strength before fully succumbing to strong shear. The system eventually dissipated on September 4, to the south of Puerto Rico. Damages were minor, though one island received several inches of rain.

Hurricane Fred

Several days after Erika dissipated, a new tropical depression formed southeast of the Cape Verde Islands on September 7. This depression rapidly intensified within an environment of low wind shear and high sea surface temperatures. Receiving the name Fred on September 8, the storm quickly developed an eye feature and was upgraded to a hurricane roughly 24 hours after being named. Upon reaching this intensity, Fred became the strongest storm on record south of 30°N and east of 35°W in the Atlantic basin. Not long after the intensification ceased, it began to weaken as dry air became entrained within the system. By September 11, the storm nearly stalled northwest of the Cape Verde Islands and weakened to a tropical storm. The following day, Fred degenerated into a remnant low before taking a westward track across the Atlantic. The remnants of Fred persisted for nearly a week, nearly regenerating into a tropical depression several times. The low eventually dissipated on September 19, to the south of Bermuda.

Tropical Depression Eight

In late September, a new, well-defined tropical wave moved off the west coast of Africa into the Atlantic Ocean. By September 25, the system had developed sufficient deep convection for the NHC to classify it as Tropical Depression Eight. Shortly thereafter, wind shear and decreasing sea surface temperatures caused the depression to weaken. The system degenerated into a remnant low on September 26 before degenerating into a trough of low pressure.

Tropical Storm Grace

Originating from an extratropical cyclone east of Newfoundland on September 27, the precursor to Tropical Storm Grace tracked southeastward towards the Azores, gaining subtropical characteristics. After executing a counterclockwise loop between October 1 and 3, deep convection wrapped around a small circulation center that had developed within the larger cyclone. On October 4, this smaller low developed into a tropical storm while situated near the Azores Islands, becoming the northeasternmost forming Atlantic tropical cyclone on record. It weakened over increasingly colder waters and began merging with an approaching frontal boundary. Early on October 6, Grace transitioned into an extratropical cyclone before dissipating later that day near Wales.

Although Grace passed through the Azores Islands, the storm had little known effects there. In Europe, the system and its remnants brought rain to several countries, including Portugal, the United Kingdom and Belgium. No fatalities were linked to Grace and overall damage was minimal.

Tropical Storm Henri

A tropical wave left the coast of Africa on October 1, moving westward with intermittent showers and thunderstorms. On October 5, the system became better organized, and a low-pressure area formed. Operationally, the storm was not designated a tropical cyclone until later on October 6, when it was immediately declared a tropical storm.

Affected by strong wind shear, Henri remained disorganized with its center located on the western edge of the convection. Shortly thereafter, the wind shear grew stronger, and on October 8 the storm weakened to a tropical depression. The structure became further disorganized with several low-level vortices. Just twelve hours after weakening into a depression, Henri degenerated into a remnant area of low pressure. The remnants continued northwestward before turning to the west-southwest due to a ridge. On October 11, the storm's circulation dissipated near Hispaniola, having never impacted land.

Hurricane Ida

The final storm of the 2009 season formed over the southern Caribbean Sea on November 4. The slow moving system quickly developed into Tropical Storm Ida within a favorable environment as it neared the coastline of Nicaragua. Several hours before moving over land, Ida attained hurricane-status, with winds reaching . Hours after moving inland, Ida weakened to a tropical storm and further to a tropical depression as it turned northward. On November 7, the depression re-entered the Caribbean Sea and quickly intensified. Early on November 8, the system re-attained hurricane intensity as it rapidly intensified over warm waters. Not long after reaching this intensity, Ida quickly weakened to a tropical storm as it entered the Gulf of Mexico. Despite strong wind shear, the storm briefly re-attained hurricane status for a third time near the southeastern Louisiana coastline before quickly weakening to a tropical storm. Shortly before moving inland over the southern United States, Ida transitioned into an extratropical cyclone. The remnants of Ida persisted until November 11, at which time the low dissipated. Remnant energy from Ida provided energy for another system which became a powerful nor'easter, causing significant damage in the Mid-Atlantic States. The resulting storm came to be known as Nor'Ida.

In the southern Caribbean, Hurricane Ida caused roughly $2.1 million in damage in Nicaragua after destroying numerous homes and leaving an estimated 40,000 people homeless. In the United States, the hurricane and the subsequent nor'easter caused substantial damage, mainly in the Mid-Atlantic States. One person was killed by Ida after drowning in rough seas while six others were killed in various incidents related to the nor'easter. Overall, the two systems caused nearly $300 million in damage throughout the country.

Storm names
The following list of names was used for named storms that formed in the North Atlantic in 2009. This was the same list used in the 2003 season, with the exceptions of Fred, Ida, and Joaquin, which replaced Fabian, Isabel, and Juan, respectively. The names Fred and Ida were used for the first time this year. There were no names retired this year; thus, the same list was used again in the 2015 season.

Season effects
This is a table of all of the storms that formed in the 2009 Atlantic hurricane season. It includes their duration, names, intensities, areas affected, damages, and death totals. Deaths in parentheses are additional and indirect (an example of an indirect death would be a traffic accident), but were still related to that storm. Damage and deaths include totals while the storm was extratropical, a wave, or a low, and all of the damage figures are in 2009 USD.

See also

Lists of Atlantic hurricanes
Atlantic hurricane season
Tropical cyclones in 2009
2009 Pacific hurricane season
2009 Pacific typhoon season
2009 North Indian Ocean cyclone season
South-West Indian Ocean cyclone seasons: 2008–09, 2009–10
Australian region cyclone seasons: 2008–09, 2009–10
South Pacific cyclone seasons: 2008–09, 2009–10
South Atlantic tropical cyclone
Mediterranean tropical-like cyclone

References

Notes

External links

 Satellite loop of the 2009 Atlantic hurricane season
 HPC rainfall page for 2009 Tropical Cyclones
 National Hurricane Center Website
 National Hurricane Center's Atlantic Tropical Weather Outlook
 Tropical Cyclone Formation Probability Guidance Product

 
Atlantic hurricane seasons
Articles which contain graphical timelines
Atlantic